Andrei Vladimirovich Burkovsky (born November 14, 1983) is a Russian theater and film actor, former KVN player, champion of the Major League as a member of the Maximum team (2008). However, after becoming famous as a comedian he soon started playing serious roles in theater, on TV and in cinema. Since 2014, he has been an actor of the Moscow Art Theatre He is known for starring in Start original series The Mediator, More.tv original series An Hour Before the Dawn and in feature films Milk, Doctor Lisa and Tchaikovsky's Wife.

Life and career
Burkovsky was born on November 14, 1983, in Tomsk. His father is a businessman and mother a restaurant owner. He studied at the Academic Lyceum of the city of Tomsk, where he began to play in KVN, playing for the school team "Shards of Stars".  In the summer of 2000, after graduating from school, he entered the Law Institute of Tomsk State University, graduating in 2005.

In 2010, Burkovsky entered the Moscow Art Theatre School for the course of Igor Zolotovitsky and Sergei Zemtsov.  He graduated in 2014.

Andrey Burkovsky enjoys playing ice hockey in his spare time.

Television
At the beginning of 2009, together with his KVN teammate Mikhail Bashkatov, he was invited to the cast of the sketch-comedy series “Give Youth!” which aired originally on STS channel, where he played the metrosexual Danila Fox, the gopnik Rzhavy, the policeman Vyushkin and the young spouse Valera, as well as a number of other characters. The show lasted for 9 seasons.

In 2012, Burkovsky got the role of Ilya in the sitcom Kitchen on the STS channel, where he appeared for the first two seasons.

Since March 2016, he has been the host of the “Not Fact” program on the Zvezda TV channel.

On October 1, 2016, Ice Age ice skating competition show returned to Channel One, and among the participants was Andrey.  His partner in the project was the famous figure skater Tatiana Navka.

In 2021 Burkovsky starred in the lead role of The Mediator, a Start original crime drama series about a manipulative negotiator Andrei Pavlov who saves hostages and people who attempt suicide. Two seasons have been released.

In 2022 Burkovsky starred in Amore More - a dramedy series about poly-amorous relationships.

Family
Father - Tomsk businessman Vladimir Grigorievich Burkovsky.
Mother - Burkovskaya Lyudmila Ivanovna, owner of the restaurants "Eternal Call" and "Hmel" in the city of Tomsk.
Brother - Alexander.  On January 8, 2009, at the age of 23, he crashed at a ski resort in Sheregesh in the Kemerovo region (while skiing, he crashed into a tree at full speed, as a result of which he received multiple injuries which led to his death).
Wife - Olga Burkovskaya (the wedding took place on August 29, 2008).
Children: March 14, 2011 son Maxim was born.  On June 5, 2013, daughter Alisa was born.

Controversy
In 2016, Andrey Burkovsky together with dancing partner Tatiana Navka drew ire from the public as they appeared in Ice Age - the Russian version of Dancing on Ice dressed as Holocaust concentration camp prisoners. Burkovsky and Navka said that the dance was inspired by the 1997 film Life Is Beautiful and was not meant to cause offense.

Filmography
Kitchen (TV series 2012–2016) - Ilya
Furious (2017) - Rotislav
Yolki 6 (2017) - Igor
Sober Driver (2019) - Stanislav
Milk (2019) - Seryozha
Deadly Illusions (2020) - Denis Romanov
Doctor Lisa (2020) - Sergei Kolesov
Tchaikovsky's Wife (2022) - Vladimir Meshchersky

References

External links

1983 births
Living people
Russian male film actors
Russian male television actors
Russian male voice actors
Russian male stage actors
20th-century Russian male actors
21st-century Russian male actors
Russian male comedians
KVN